Šahy (rarely ) is a town in southern Slovakia,  The town has an ethnic Hungarian majority and its population is 7,238 people (2018), with an average age of 42.5.

Geography
It is located at the eastern reaches of the Danubian Lowland on the river Ipeľ at the Hungarian border, on the E77 road from Budapest to Kraków. Besides the main settlement, it also has two "boroughs" of Preseľany nad Ipľom ( west of centre, annexed 1980) and Tešmák ( east of centre, annexed 1986). From 1980 to 1996 it also had now independent village of Hrkovce.

History
The first written mention is from 1237 in a document of King Béla IV under name Saag, when Martin Hont-Pázmány founded a Premonstratensian monastery there. It got character of a small town in the 14th century. It was part of Ottoman Empire between 1541–1595 and 1605–1685 and was known as "Şefradi". It was also sanjak centre in Uyvar eyalet between 1663 and 1685. Before break-up of Austria-Hungary in 1918/1920 and incorporation into Czechoslovakia, it was part of the Hont County, and was from 1806 its capital. It was part of Hungary from 1938 to 1945 as a result of the First Vienna Award.

Demographics
According to the 2014 census, the town had 7,516 inhabitants. In 2001 62.21% of the inhabitants were Hungarians, 34.57% Slovaks, 0.56% Czech and 0.41 Roma. The religious makeup was 84.06% Roman Catholics, 6.87% people with no religious affiliation, and 3.46% Lutherans.

Facilities
The town is home to the Hont Museum and Gallery of Ľudovít Simony.

Twin towns – sister cities

Šahy is twinned with:
 Héhalom, Hungary
 Vác, Hungary
 Veresegyház, Hungary

Notable people
 Ferdinand Daučík, football player and manager
 Branko Kubala, football player
 Ladislav Ballek, writer

References

External links
 The official website of Šahy
 Tourist-channel.sk

Cities and towns in Slovakia
Hungary–Slovakia border crossings
Hungarian communities in Slovakia